Numerous video games based on the Jurassic Park franchise have been released. Developers Ocean Software, BlueSky Software and Sega produced various games in 1993, coinciding with the first film, Jurassic Park. In 1997, several developers, including DreamWorks Interactive and Appaloosa Interactive, produced various games for nine different platforms to coincide with the release of the film The Lost World: Jurassic Park.

For the 2001 film, Jurassic Park III, a total of seven games were produced, including three for the Game Boy Advance and three PC games. A park-building game, Jurassic Park: Operation Genesis, was released in 2003. Jurassic Park: The Game, released in 2011, takes place after the events of the first film. Lego Jurassic World was released in 2015 and is based on the first four films. Subsequent games have continued to use the Jurassic World name, including Jurassic World Evolution, another park-building game that was released in 2018. A number of other video games, not based directly on any of the films, have also been released since 1994.

Jurassic Park (1993)
Ocean Software released three distinct Jurassic Park games optimized for different platforms, while Sega released four distinct versions of Jurassic Park for five different platforms. In each version, the player has to complete several objectives to finish the game and escape the island of Isla Nublar.

Ocean Software
Ocean Software devoted two of its development teams to work on several Jurassic Park games, making it the biggest film license that the company had ever worked on.

Jurassic Park, released for the Nintendo Entertainment System (NES) and Nintendo's Game Boy, is an action-adventure game played from an overhead perspective, with various goals that loosely follow the plot of the film. The NES version was released in June 1993, followed shortly by the Game Boy version, which is a port of the earlier version.

Another variation was the Super NES version of Jurassic Park, which incorporates isometric gameplay for outside environments but uses a first person perspective for indoor environments. Objectives include turning on the park's power system and rebooting the main computers, as well as collecting raptor eggs.

Ocean also released a computer version of Jurassic Park for DOS and Amiga. As in the Super NES version, the PC version also features isometric and first-person shooter perspectives.

Sega
Sega published a side-scrolling platformer action game titled Jurassic Park for the Sega Genesis. Developed by BlueSky Software, the game can be played in two modes, either as Dr. Alan Grant or as a Velociraptor. Playing as each provides the user with an alternative story and different levels.

Another Jurassic Park game, developed and published by Sega, was released for the Game Gear and Master System in 1993. It is a side-scrolling platform game which includes several driving levels.

A point-and-click adventure game, titled Jurassic Park as well, was released in 1994. It was developed and published by Sega for the Sega CD (also known as the Mega-CD). The game's events take place after the film. The player controls a scientist who becomes stranded on Isla Nublar after a helicopter crash. The player must search the island to retrieve eggs from seven different dinosaur species and place them in an incubator at the Jurassic Park visitor center.

Also in 1994, Sega released a rail shooter arcade game titled Jurassic Park. It features missions that involve the player using a joystick to protect a vehicle by shooting any targets that appear on screen. The machine's cabinet resembles the rear of the film's Ford Explorer tour vehicles and contains hydraulic pistons to move the seat according to action on the screen.

Sequels and other games (1994–1996)
A sequel to the Sega Genesis version of Jurassic Park, entitled Jurassic Park: Rampage Edition, was released in 1994, and immediately follows the events of its predecessor. In it, Grant's helicopter crashes on Isla Nublar after taking off from the island. Now he must deal not only with dinosaurs, but InGen soldiers as well. As in the game's predecessor, the player can play as either Grant or a Velociraptor.

Additionally, Universal Interactive released Jurassic Park Interactive exclusively on the 3DO Interactive Multiplayer in 1994. The game plays out through eight different minigames and features FMV segments starring look-alikes of the main characters. Also in 1994, Hi Tech Entertainment released Jurassic Park: Paint and Activity Center, a painting activity game for DOS.

Ocean developed an action side-scrolling platform game titled Jurassic Park 2: The Chaos Continues and released it for the SNES and Game Boy in 1995. The SNES version uses an original story and is a sequel to the film, while the Game Boy version reuses the film's plot. In the SNES version, which takes place one year after the events of the film, the player controls Dr. Alan Grant, who is sent to Isla Nublar by John Hammond to prevent BioSyn (a rival genetics company) from stealing dinosaurs from the island.

On August 12, 1996, Universal launched an online game titled Jurassic Park – The Ride Online Adventure, to promote Jurassic Park: The Ride. In the game, the player controls Jurassic Park's director of operations, who must stop an escaped Velociraptor that is wondering inside a compound, where the game takes place. The player must walk through hallways while avoiding the Velociraptor. The player must search in offices and other rooms for objects that can be used and combined with one another to stop the Velociraptor or gain entry to new areas. The game includes a feature known as the "IntraNet", which contains files on the park's employees and records, as well as information on InGen and its dinosaurs.

The Lost World: Jurassic Park (1997)
To coincide with The Lost World: Jurassic Park, the second film in the series, studio DreamWorks utilized its internal software company, DreamWorks Interactive, to create their own game.

For the PlayStation and Sega Saturn, DreamWorks and Appaloosa Interactive developed The Lost World: Jurassic Park, a side-scrolling platform game portrayed in a 3D rendered environment. The game has five playable characters and 30 levels. In 1998, an updated version of The Lost World: Jurassic Park was released for the PlayStation, with improved gameplay.

Appaloosa Interactive developed another version of The Lost World: Jurassic Park that was published by Sega for the Sega Genesis. Played from an overhead view, the game contains levels brought together by four hub areas on Isla Sorna and also contains four unique boss levels. It also has driveable vehicles, a large number of dinosaurs, and a GPS system used for mission objectives.

Four versions of the game were developed and published by different companies for handheld game consoles, including the Game Boy, Game Gear, and Tiger Electronics' Game.com and R-Zone consoles.

DreamWorks also released Chaos Island: The Lost World, a strategy video game for Microsoft Windows, with similar gameplay to Command & Conquer. The game is played across 12 levels, and involves the player creating dinosaurs that can be controlled and used against enemies. Six actors from the film provided their voice to the game.

An arcade game titled The Lost World: Jurassic Park was also released by Sega, and made use of the Model 3 arcade hardware.

In 1998, a first-person shooter titled Trespasser was released for Windows, billed as a digital sequel to the film The Lost World: Jurassic Park. The game was highly ambitious with one of the first large scale physics engines in an action game. The developer was pushed by the publisher. This meant many elements of the planned game design were shelved and many bugs, some major, still remained in the game, resulting in negative critical reception. In April 2002, the game received a large modding community called TresCom, which released many patches and graphical updates for download on their forums.

Warpath: Jurassic Park (1999)

In 1999, DreamWorks released Warpath: Jurassic Park, a fighting game for the PlayStation, featuring 14 playable dinosaurs and arenas based on locations from the first two films.

Jurassic Park III (2001)
To coincide with the third film in the series, Jurassic Park III, a number of video games were released for the PC, arcade and Game Boy Advance.

Knowledge Adventure developed and published two video games aimed primarily at a younger target audience: a side-scrolling platformer titled Jurassic Park III: Dino Defender; and Jurassic Park III: Danger Zone!, in which the player moves around on a virtual board game map. Later that year, Knowledge Adventure produced Scan Command: Jurassic Park, which utilized a portable barcode scanner accessory known as the Scan Command.

A light gun arcade game titled Jurassic Park III was developed and published by Konami in 2001. Players control a mercenary team sent to Isla Sorna to rescue survivors. AllGame's Jon Thompson rated it three and a half stars out of five, criticizing its outdated graphics while praising the music and sound.

Also in 2001, Konami published three games for the Game Boy Advance, two of which were also developed by the company:

 Jurassic Park III: Island Attack was developed by Mobile21. The game is an isometric action-adventure game, where one plays as Dr. Alan Grant trying to escape Isla Sorna by traversing the 8 different game environments to reach a rescue boat. The game allows the player to choose to run from many of the enemies encountered, or collect and use items to destroy them.
Jurassic Park III: The DNA Factor is a side-scrolling platformer with many puzzle-solving elements. The game allows the player to play as either a professional photographer or pilot to search Isla Sorna for the DNA of dinosaurs. Each level involves fighting dinosaurs while searching for all of the DNA to open the exit. Then, using the collected DNA, the player must correctly create different species of dinosaurs, which becomes increasingly complex as the game progresses.
Jurassic Park III: Park Builder is a construction and management simulation game viewed from an omnipotent perspective. In the game, the player creates a virtual amusement park that includes rides, shops, food outlets, and dinosaur facilities.

Announced in 2001, Jurassic Park: Survival was a third-person adventure game in development by Savage Entertainment for the PlayStation 2 and Xbox, as well as the GameCube and PC. However, due to conflicts with Vivendi Universal over payments, the game was canceled.

Universal Studios Theme Parks Adventure (2001)

In 2001, Universal Studios Theme Parks Adventure was released for the GameCube. Based on many of the Universal theme park rides, the Jurassic Park ride requires the player to take control of a gun turret on the back of a Jeep to defend against dinosaurs.

Jurassic Park: Dinosaur Battles (2002)
A PC game titled Jurassic Park: Dinosaur Battles, also produced by Knowledge Adventure, was released on September 10, 2002. Dinosaur Battles is basically Scan Command: Jurassic Park without the portable scanner accessory. The game involves a group of young explorers stranded on Isla Sorna, where the evil Dr. Corts (voiced by Kath Soucie) has carried out experiments to control dinosaurs and pit them against each other for fights.

The game features six playable creatures throughout the game, each one with six primary skills to defend against Corts' creatures. Before playing against enemies, the player must arrange pieces of dinosaur DNA to enable each creature's skills. Unlike Scan Command, which requires the player to scan barcodes to receive DNA, Dinosaur Battles presents the player with a list of more than 500 DNA pieces.

The game primarily consists of the player controlling a creature from a top-down perspective while carrying out tasks such as locating certain facilities. During this portion of the game, enemy dinosaurs often randomly challenge the player to a battle. The player can fight or choose to abandon the battle. In 2018, Zack Zwiezen of Kotaku ranked the game among the "weirdest" Jurassic Park games ever released, stating that it was like Warpath: Jurassic Park but with an "unnecessary and weird" storyline and "less fun" combat.

Jurassic Park: Operation Genesis (2003)

In March 2003, Vivendi Universal Games released Jurassic Park: Operation Genesis, a park-building video game developed by Blue Tongue Entertainment that allows players to recreate their own Jurassic Park, featuring 25 dinosaurs and a multitude of rides, shops and other attractions. The game was released on Xbox, PlayStation 2 and PC.

Jurassic Park Institute Tour: Dinosaur Rescue (2003)
Jurassic Park Institute Tour: Dinosaur Rescue is an action video game featuring a collection of minigames. It was developed and published by Rocket Company and released for the Game Boy Advance exclusively in Japan on July 18, 2003. The game was sold exclusively through the Jurassic Park Institute Tour, a large educational travelling exhibition in Japan. In 2018, Zack Zwiezen of Kotaku noted that the minigames were "simple, but the art is colorful and cute".

Later Jurassic Park games (2007–2015)
In August 2007, Brighter Minds Media, Inc. and Universal released Jurassic Park Explorer, an interactive DVD game and board game that are played together. The goal of the game, set on Isla Sorna, is to resurrect dinosaurs by progressing along the game board and completing each of the DVD game's seven mini-games. The DVD game also includes over 300 dinosaur trivia questions and clips from the first three films.

In August 2010, Gameloft released Jurassic Park, an action/adventure mobile game based on the first film. As Dr. Alan Grant or Dr. Ian Malcolm, the player must escape from Isla Nublar while fighting against dinosaurs, mercenaries, and poachers. The player can also play as a T. rex. Jurassic Park: The Game, a four-part episodic adventure game series set after the events of the first film, was developed and published by Telltale Games on November 15, 2011, for Xbox 360, PlayStation 3, PC and Mac.

Jurassic Park is among the films featured in Universal Movie Tycoon, an iPhone game developed and published by Fuse Powered Inc. in March 2012. In the game, the player creates a movie studio and subsequently recreates films that were released by Universal Pictures. Jurassic Park Builder, developed and published by Ludia in July 2012, is a construction and management simulation video game in which the player builds a Jurassic Park theme park. An Aquatic Park with aquatic animals and a Glacier Park with extinct animals from the Cenozoic era can also be constructed.

A fan-created project, titled Jurassic Park: Aftermath, is not a full video game, instead featuring Isla Nublar's Jurassic Park as an interactive environment that can be explored. The project had been in development since at least March 2013, using the CryEngine 3 game engine, but development had been suspended by May 2016. A new arcade game, titled Jurassic Park Arcade and developed by Raw Thrills, was released in March 2015, and is based on the original trilogy in the film series.

Jurassic World trilogy
There have been several video games based on the Jurassic World trilogy. Ludia released an updated version of Jurassic Park Builder in April 2015, titled Jurassic World: The Game, for iOS mobile devices.

Lego Jurassic World

Lego Jurassic World, an action-adventure video game developed by Traveller's Tales and published by Warner Bros. Interactive Entertainment, was released for eight different game systems on June 12, 2015, coinciding with the film's theatrical release. An OS X port by Feral Interactive followed shortly thereafter, on 23 July. The game is based on the series' first four films, and was later released for Android and iOS on March 31, 2016. A Nintendo Switch version was released on September 17, 2019.

Jurassic World Survivor
By June 2014, Cryptic Studios was developing a third-person open-world video game, similar to H1Z1 and based on Jurassic World, in which the player would assume the role of Owen Grady. The game was being developed with the Unreal Engine 4 game engine, and was nearly finished when it was cancelled in May 2015, after the closure of Cryptic Studios' Seattle location. It was to be released on Steam, Xbox Live, and the PlayStation Network. In June 2016, the game was reported to be in development by a different studio, with Perfect World Entertainment as publisher. In October, Perfect World reserved a web domain for the game at JurassicWorldSurvivor.com. Two months later, the company filed a trademark for Jurassic World Survivor.

Jurassic World Alive
Jurassic World Alive, a Pokémon Go-style game, allows the player to build a collection of dinosaurs that can be used in battles against other players. The game also allows players to create their own dinosaurs using hybrid DNA as well as fusing dinosaurs with Cenozoic creatures. The game was developed by Ludia and co-published with Universal, and released in May 2018 for iOS and Android. The game included more than 100 dinosaurs upon its release, and more are expected to be added in regular updates. The game was first released in Canada on March 14, 2018.

Jurassic World Evolution games

Jurassic World Evolution is a park-building game released in June 2018, coinciding with the release of the fifth film, Jurassic World: Fallen Kingdom. The game is based on the 2015 film, and was developed and published by Frontier Developments. In addition to management and simulation, the game also features creature development. A Nintendo Switch port of the game, titled Jurassic World Evolution: Complete Edition, was released on November 3, 2020.

Jurassic World Evolution 2 was released on November 9, 2021, on PC, PlayStation 4, PlayStation 5, Xbox One, and Xbox Series X and Series S. It is set after the events of Jurassic World: Fallen Kingdom.

Jurassic World Aftermath

Jurassic World Aftermath is a virtual reality game for the Oculus Quest and Oculus Quest 2. Developed by Coatsink, it was released on December 17, 2020. The game takes place on Isla Nublar, two years after the events of Jurassic World, and prior to the events of Jurassic World: Fallen Kingdom. Much of the gameplay is focused on the player avoiding raptors in a facility. In 2021, Coatsink released Jurassic World Aftermath: Part 2, a continuation in the form of paid downloadable content.

Other games
Characters and settings from Jurassic World appear in the 2015 crossover toys-to-life video game Lego Dimensions. Online slot developer Microgaming released Jurassic World, a slot game for desktop and mobile devices, on June 20, 2017.

A virtual reality video game titled VRSE Jurassic World was created by Skyrocket, LLC. In the United States, the game was released for iOS on August 8, 2017, while an Android version was released the following month.

In August 2020, Mojang Studios released a Jurassic World-themed package of downloadable content (DLC) for its online game Minecraft.

An iOS and Android mobile game, Jurassic World Primal Ops, was developed by Behaviour Interactive. It is an action-adventure game viewed from a top-down perspective. The player traverses North America rescuing dinosaurs from poachers, mercenaries, and science research. Rescued dinosaurs become battle companions, each with their own ability. The game received a soft launch in certain countries in January 2022, and was officially released on June 30, 2022.

Video games

Titles released in the 1990s

Titles released in the 2000s

Titles released in the 2010s

Titles released in the 2020s

Cancelled titles

Related titles

See also
Jurassic Park (pinball)

References

External links

 
Video game franchises
Jurassic Park